Solemys is an extinct genus of stem turtle known from the Late Cretaceous (late Campanian-early Maastrichtian) of southern France and eastern Spain.

Taxonomy
Two species are known, the type species Solemys gaudryi (Matheron, 1869) and S. vermiculata de Lapparent de Broin and Murelaga, 1996. The former was originally assigned to the Cenozoic turtle genus Apholidemys by Matheron (1869), but de Lapparent de Broin and Murelaga (1996) recognized it as a stem turtle distinct from Apholidemys and renamed it Solemys.

References

Fossil taxa described in 1996
Late Cretaceous turtles
Extinct turtles
Testudinata